The 2016 season was Felda United's 10th competitive season and 6th consecutive season in the top flight of Malaysian football, Liga Super.

Results and fixtures

Pre-season and friendlies

Malaysia Super League

League table

FA Cup

Malaysia Cup

Group stage

Quarter-finals

Players

First team squad

Squad goals statistics
Correct as of match played on 21 September 2016

Transfers
See list of transfers first window transfers and second window transfers

References

External links
 Official Website

Felda United F.C.
Malaysian football clubs 2016 season